Argyractis iasusalis is a moth in the family Crambidae. It is found in Brazil.

References

Acentropinae
Moths of South America
Moths described in 1859